Adam Snow Frampton is an American architect and educator. He is a Principal of Only If, a New York City-based design practice for architecture and urbanism, founded in 2013, together with architect Karolina Czeczek. He is the co-author of the pedestrian-centric Cities Without Ground: A Hong Kong Guidebook. He has been celebrated at the 12th, 14th, and 16th Venice Biennale of Architecture.

He is also an Adjunct Assistant Professor at Columbia Graduate School of Architecture, Planning and Preservation. and has taught as a Visiting Assistant Professor at the University of Kentucky College of Design and as a Visiting Critic at the Syracuse University School of Architecture.

Professional life
Adam Snow Frampton studied architecture at the University of Colorado at Boulder (B.EnvD, 2002) and the Princeton University School of Architecture (MArch 2006).

From 2006 to 2013, Adam Snow Frampton worked at the Office for Metropolitan Architecture (OMA) in Rotterdam and Hong Kong as an Associate. He was a key leader in the design and construction of the Taipei Performing Arts Center from 2008 to 2013.

In 2013, Frampton founded Only If, a New York City-based practice for architecture and urbanism. Only If is engaged a range of design projects at different scales, from small interiors and single family housing to multi-family housing and larger-scale urban design, research and speculation. Only If's notable realized works include small interiors such as Voyager Espresso, City of Saints Bryant Park, and An Office for Three Companies. In 2017, Only If was selected to contribute to the Regional Plan Association's Fourth Regional Plan. In 2019, Only If won an international open competition organized by the American Institute of Architects New York chapter and the New York City Department of Housing Preservation and Development to design and develop affordable housing on vacant irregular lots, a topic the firm had previously been researching for several years and which is also related to Only If's ongoing Narrow House.

Awards and Recognitions
 Domus, 50 Best Architecture Firms (2020)
 Architect Magazine, Next Progressives (2019)
 AIA New York, New Practices New York (2018)
 Pin-Up Magazine, New Power Generation (2016)
 World Interior News, Emerging Interior Practice of the Year (2016)

Published works

References

External links

21st-century American architects
Architects from New York City
Columbia University faculty
Columbia Graduate School of Architecture, Planning and Preservation faculty
Princeton University alumni
1980 births
Living people